Chingiz Sadykhov, also spelled Sadikhov or Sadighov (5 April 1929, in Baku – 30 December 2017, in California), was a Soviet and Azerbaijani musician and pianist. He was active in Baku and San Francisco.

Biography 
He graduated from Bul-Bul Musical School in Baku and Azerbaijani State Conservatory. Mr. Sadykhov further studied for PhD degree in Moscow Conservatory under professor Goldenveyser. Then he returned to Baku where he lived until 1994 before migration to the United States. He resided in San Francisco.

Initially Chingiz Sadykhov played classical music but later switched to Azerbaijani music. He has spent much of his life accompanying Azerbaijan's most prominent singers, including Bulbul, the founder of Azerbaijan's professional vocal school; Rashid Behbudov, the singer who most often represented Azerbaijan throughout the world during the Soviet period; and Muslim Magomayev, one of the former Soviet Union's best-known pop stars. When asked how many songs are in his repertoire, Chingiz readily admitted that there were so many that he wouldn't know where to start counting.

Albums

 Songs Of Azerbaijan (1998)
 Piano Music Of Azerbaijan (2003)
 Muzik Of Azerbaijan (2006)

References

External links
Chingiz Sadykhov's Interview
To listen to Chingiz, click here.
Chingiz Sadykhov , 

1929 births
2017 deaths
Azerbaijani classical pianists
Musicians from Baku
Baku Academy of Music alumni
Moscow Conservatory alumni
Azerbaijani emigrants to the United States